Kaistia algarum is a Gram-negative, strictly aerobic and non-motile bacterium from the genus of Kaistia which has been isolated from the alga Paulinella chromatophora.

References

Hyphomicrobiales
Bacteria described in 2018